Karađorđev Park Stadium is a multi-purpose stadium in Zrenjanin, Serbia.  It is currently used mostly for football matches and is the home ground of FK Proleter Zrenjanin .  The stadium is capable of seating 18,500  people.

Gallery

See also 
List of stadiums in Serbia
Crystal Hall, Zrenjanin

References 

Football venues in Serbia
Football venues in Serbia and Montenegro
Athletics (track and field) venues in Serbia and Montenegro
Football venues in Yugoslavia
Athletics (track and field) venues in Yugoslavia
Buildings and structures in Vojvodina
Zrenjanin
Multi-purpose stadiums in Serbia